Mattoo, also spelled Mattu, is a Kashmiri Pandit clan and surname. They are native to the Kashmir Valley within the Jammu & Kashmir, India.

Notable Mattoos

Amitabh Mattoo, Academic
Mehraj Mattoo, banker
Priyadarshini Mattoo, murder victim 
Leenesh Mattoo, actor
Junaid Azim Mattu, politician
Sanna Irshad Mattoo, photojournalist

References

Surnames
Surnames of Indian origin
Kashmiri tribes
Indian surnames
Hindu surnames
Kashmiri-language surnames
Brahmin communities
Social groups of Jammu and Kashmir
Social groups of India